The 2018 JEGS 200 was the 5th stock car race of the 2018 NASCAR Camping World Truck Series season, and the 19th iteration of the event. The race was held on Friday, May 4, 2018 in Dover, Delaware at Dover International Speedway, a  oval-shaped permanent racetrack. The race was extended from the scheduled 200 laps to 210 laps due to a late race caution including Noah Gragson, Johnny Sauter of GMS Racing would be able to hold off the field on the final restart to take the win, the 19th of his career and the 2nd of the season. To fill out the podium, Matt Crafton of ThorSport Racing and Justin Haley of GMS Racing would finish 2nd and 3rd, respectively.

Background 

Dover International Speedway is an oval race track in Dover, Delaware, United States that has held at least two NASCAR races since it opened in 1969. In addition to NASCAR, the track also hosted USAC and the NTT IndyCar Series. The track features one layout, a 1 mile (1.6 km) concrete oval, with 24° banking in the turns and 9° banking on the straights. The speedway is owned and operated by Dover Motorsports.

The track, nicknamed "The Monster Mile", was built in 1969 by Melvin Joseph of Melvin L. Joseph Construction Company, Inc., with an asphalt surface, but was replaced with concrete in 1995. Six years later in 2001, the track's capacity moved to 135,000 seats, making the track have the largest capacity of sports venue in the mid-Atlantic. In 2002, the name changed to Dover International Speedway from Dover Downs International Speedway after Dover Downs Gaming and Entertainment split, making Dover Motorsports. From 2007 to 2009, the speedway worked on an improvement project called "The Monster Makeover", which expanded facilities at the track and beautified the track. After the 2014 season, the track's capacity was reduced to 95,500 seats.

Entry list 

*Withdrew.

Practice

First practice 
First practice was held on 2:05 PM EST.

Second and final practice 
Final practice was held on 4:05 PM EST.

Qualifying 
Qualifying was held on Friday, May 4, at 1:05 PM EST. Since Dover International Speedway is under , the qualifying system was a multi-car system that included three rounds. The first round was 15 minutes, where every driver would be able to set a lap within the 15 minutes. Then, the second round would consist of the fastest 24 cars in Round 1, and drivers would have 10 minutes to set a lap. Round 3 consisted of the fastest 12 drivers from Round 2, and the drivers would have 5 minutes to set a time. Whoever was fastest in Round 3 would win the pole.

Todd Peck of Beaver Motorsports would be the only driver not to set a lap time, due to the team wanting to have the entry to be a "start and park". He would eventually park and retire the car very early in the race, after the team realizing that the #74 of Harmon would stay out, saying to Peck "Alright [Todd], we appreciate you bud, take it back to the hauler.” He would finish last out of a 32 car field.

Race results 
Stage 1 Laps: 45

Stage 2 Laps: 45

Stage 3 Laps: 120

References 

2018 NASCAR Camping World Truck Series
NASCAR races at Dover Motor Speedway
May 2018 sports events in the United States
2018 in sports in Delaware